Włosty may refer to the following places:
Włosty, Masovian Voivodeship (east-central Poland)
Włosty, Gołdap County in Warmian-Masurian Voivodeship (north Poland)
Włosty, Pisz County in Warmian-Masurian Voivodeship (north Poland)